Joseph Mensah is the member of parliament for the constituency. He was elected on the ticket of the New Patriotic Party (NPP) and won a majority of 21,041 votes to become the MP.

See also
List of Ghana Parliament constituencies

References 

Parliamentary constituencies in the Western Region (Ghana)